Savages are an English rock band that formed in 2011 in London. Their debut album, Silence Yourself was released on 6 May 2013 via Matador Records. It reached number 19 in the UK Albums Chart in May 2013, and was critically acclaimed. It peaked at number 5 on the Irish and the UK Independent Albums Chart, and at number 13 on the US Billboard Independent Albums chart. The band's second album Adore Life, was released on 22 January 2016. Both albums were nominated for the Mercury Prize, in 2013 and 2016 respectively.

History
Savages are a rock band from London. The band's guitarist Gemma Thompson had come up with the name for the band and had been discussing the idea with singer Jehnny Beth for almost a year. Thompson says the band's name was derived from books, such as Lord of the Flies, that she read when she was younger. The band was eventually formed in October 2011 and they had their first gig in January 2012, supporting rock band British Sea Power. Their manager John Best also manages Sigur Ros. The Observer has said of Savages: "it's not exactly sexy, it's not funny and they're not going to be rolling around in mud like the Slits. But it's the closest thing to art that "post-punk"... has offered in a while". The New Musical Express described their performances as "frottage-inducingly intense affairs".

The group's first released tracks, a double A-side in June 2012, were "Flying to Berlin" and "Husbands" on the Pop Noire label. The Guardian wrote: "Husbands makes us dream of what it must have been like to have been around to hear, in real time, the debut releases by Public Image Ltd, Magazine, Siouxsie and the Banshees and Joy Division, to feel, as those incredible records hit the shops, that unearthly power and sense of a transmission from a satellite reality." In October, their concert at the CMJ Music Marathon in New York received good reviews. The Chicago Reader noted that their set was "influenced by Siouxsie & the Banshees, but with an anthemic quality that makes me think of PJ Harvey and heavy doses of the rhythmic jaggedness and angularity of British postpunk." The group expressed their liking for these bands, and added : "We listened to a lot of different music [...] Our influences are male and female in equal measure." 

On 9 December 2012, the BBC announced that the band had been nominated for the Sound of 2013 poll.

The band's first album, Silence Yourself, was released on 6 May 2013 via Beth's own label Pop Noire and Matador Records.

Savages played on the second day of the Coachella Music and Arts Festival in 2013 and were well received by reviewers. In 2014 the band, together with the Japanese art-rock four-piece Bo Ningen, performed Words To The Blind, a sonic poem where both bands play simultaneously.

On two occasions the band asked local choreographers in London and New York City to perform a dance piece on a 30-minute version of their track ‘Dead Nature’ in the middle of the crowd. In a Pop Matters interview with  Guy Mankowski the band discussed how at another of their events at the Ministry of Sound the crowd were placed around the musicians in order to ‘create total immersion and intimacy’.

"Husbands" was featured during the end credits of the 2015 science fiction film Ex Machina.

In July 2015, Savages, A Dead Forest Index  and choreographer/dance artist Fernanda Muñoz-Newsome created two nights of performance as part of Station to Station: A 30-day Happening at the Barbican Centre in London. The performances took place in the Barbican Gallery and incorporated music, poetry, dance and the interplay of light and darkness. The performances were recorded and released on vinyl at Station to Station.

In November 2016, the band curated their own program during the tenth Anniversary Edition of Le Guess Who? Festival in Utrecht, The Netherlands. The program included performances by Beak, Tim Hecker, Jessy Lanza, Bo Ningen and Hannah Peel.

The band's second album Adore Life, was released on 22 January 2016 via Matador Records. The band then went on a world tour in support of the album, wrapping in July 2017 at Presqu'île de Malsaucy in Belfort, France. The band has not performed together or released new material since then, with each member instead focusing on other projects.

Side projects
Beth released her first solo album To Love Is to Live in June 2020. She also actively teamed up with other musicians, such as the Strokes' frontman Julian Casablancas; as duet singer for a Sort Sol and Lydia Lunch cover, "Boy/Girl", Trentemøller; as featured artist in the song "Complicated" and as singer-songwriter for the song "River in Me", and Damon Albarn of Gorillaz; as featured artist, in the second single from album Humanz, "We Got the Power" and with IDLES for their song "Ne Touche Pas Moi" on their 2020 album Ultra Mono. In 2017, she revealed a collaboration with Primal Scream front man Bobby Gillespie for her upcoming solo works. The two later made a studio album together, Utopian Ashes, in 2021.

Hassan formed an experimental electronic duo with fellow bassist Kendra Frost as Kite Base in 2015. The band released their debut album, Latent Whispers, in May 2017. Together with Milton, Hassan also formed Otomo X, an experimental collaborative group with London-based DJ and producer Martin Dubka. Milton and Hassan also formed a duo, 180dB, in 2018. Their debut single, "Road Trip," featured former Perfect Pussy vocalist Meredith Graves and Yeah Yeah Yeahs guitarist Nick Zinner. Hassan began her solo project, Esya, in 2019.

In June 2017, Thompson announced the introduction recordings/sketches of her solo project, Bashan, formed over several years whilst recording and touring extensively with Savages. She also worked with filmmaker and director  Nick Ebeling, completing her first score for a 2016 American documentary film Along For The Ride, which premiered at Venice Film Festival in 2016.

Members
 Jehnny Beth – vocals (2011–present)
 Gemma Thompson – guitar (2011–present)
 Ayse Hassan – bass (2011–present)
 Fay Milton – drums (2011–present)

Discography

Studio albums

Collaborative albums
 Words to the Blind (2014) (with Bo Ningen)
 In What I'm Seeing; The Sun (2015) (with A Dead Forest Index)

Extended plays
 I Am Here Live EP (2012)
City's Full, Give Me A Gun, I Am Here, Husbands

Singles
 Flying To Berlin / Husbands (2012)
 She Will (2013)
 Shut Up (2013)
 Fuckers / Dream Baby Dream (2014)
 The Answer (2015)
 T.I.W.Y.G (2015)
 Surrender (2016)

Music videos

Awards and nominations

References

External links

 
 An Interview With Fay Milton The Drummer's Journal

All-female punk bands
Musical groups established in 2011
English indie rock groups
Matador Records artists
Musical groups from London
Musical quartets
Post-punk revival music groups
2011 establishments in England